Hale City is a ghost town in central Hale County, Texas, United States. It was located northwest of Hale Center, a city near Plainview, Texas, and was merged with Epworth in 1891 to form Hale Center.

References

Ghost towns in the Texas South Plains
Geography of Hale County, Texas